"Won't Stop Now" is a song performed by American contemporary worship band Elevation Worship released as the lead single from their eleventh live album, Hallelujah Here Below (2018), on August 3, 2018. The song was written by Chris Brown and Steven Furtick. Chris Brown and Aaron Robertson handled the production of the single.

Background
On August 3, 2018, "Won't Stop Now" was released by Elevation Worship as the lead single from the album Hallelujah Here Below, in anticipation of its release which was slated for September 28, 2018. Chris Brown spoke of the song, saying:

On April 12, 2019, a revamped version of "Won't Stop Now" was released on Elevation Worship's album Paradoxology (2019), a collection of revamped songs initially released on Hallelujah Here Below.

Composition

Music videos
On August 3, 2018, Elevation Worship released the live music video of "Won't Stop Now" recorded at Elevation Church's Ballantyne campus on its YouTube channel. The music video for the Paradoxology rendition of "Won't Stop Now" shot on location at Savona Mill was availed on Elevation Worship's YouTube channel on April 15, 2019. The lyric video of "No Se Detendrá (Won't Stop Now)" in Spanish was published on YouTube by Elevation Worship on July 19, 2019.

Tracklisting

Charts

Weekly charts

Year-end charts

Release history

References

External links
 

2018 singles
Elevation Worship songs
Songs written by Steven Furtick
2018 songs